National Aviation Academy (NAA) is a private for-profit aviation maintenance technician school with campuses in Concord, Massachusetts and Clearwater, Florida.

Locations 
NAA's Tampa Bay campus is in Clearwater, Florida, and functions as the main headquarters and teaching center. The shop/lab training hangar is at the St. Pete–Clearwater International Airport. 

NAA's New England campus is in Concord, Massachusetts, and houses classrooms, offices and lab spaces for training. The training hangar is at Minute Man Air Field in Stow, Massachusetts. National Aviation Academy of New England is accredited by the Accrediting Commission of Career Schools and Colleges.

References

External links
 

Aviation licenses and certifications
Aviation schools in Florida
Buildings and structures in Clearwater, Florida
Buildings and structures in Concord, Massachusetts
Universities and colleges in Florida
Universities and colleges in Middlesex County, Massachusetts
Universities and colleges accredited by the Council on Occupational Education